
Gmina Barcin is an urban-rural gmina (administrative district) in Żnin County, Kuyavian-Pomeranian Voivodeship, in north-central Poland.

Villages
Apart from the town of Barcin, Gmina Barcin contains the villages and settlements of Aleksandrowo, Augustowo, Barcin-Wieś, Bielawy, Dąbrówka Barcińska, Gulczewo, Józefinka, Julianowo, Kania, Knieja, Krotoszyn, Mamlicz, Młodocin, Piechcin, Pturek, Sadłogoszcz, Szeroki Kamień, Wapienno, Wolice, Zalesie Barcińskie and Złotowo.

Neighbouring gminas
Gmina Barcin is bordered by the gminas of Dąbrowa, Łabiszyn, Pakość, Złotniki Kujawskie and Żnin.

References
Polish official population figures 2006

Barcin
Żnin County